Ali Yusif oglu Zeynalov (4 April 1913 – 4 January 1988) was an Azerbaijani Soviet actor of theater and cinema,  (1964),  (1939), laureate of the Mirza Fatali Akhundov State Prize of the Azerbaijan SSR (1965).

Biography 
Ali Zeynalov was born on 4 April 1913 in the city of Salyan in the family of a prominent teacher, honored teacher of the Azerbaijan SSR Yusif Abdullah oglu Zeynalov. In 1933, Ali Zeynalov graduated from the Baku Theater College. From 1934 to 1945 he played on the stage of the J. Jabbarly Yerevan Drama Theater. Among the roles he has played on the stage of this theater are such roles as Bakhshi, Ogtay, and Aydin in Jafar Jabbarly's plays , Ogtay El-ogly, and Aydin, Neznamov in Alexander Ostrovsky's , Othello, and King Claudius in William Shakespeare's Othello and Hamlet, and others.

From 1945 to 1975, Zeynalov performed at the M. Azizbekov Azerbaijan State Drama Theater. The best roles played by him on the stage of this theater are Seyran in Alexander Shirvanzade's Namus, Florizel and Antony in William Shakespeare's The Winter's Tale and Anthony and Cleopatra, Gilbert in Victor Hugo's Marie Tudor, Sancho in Lope de Vega's , Ahmed Rza in Nâzım Hikmet's Strange man, Hasanzade in Ilyas Afandiyev's You Are Always with Me, and Protasov in Leo Tolstoy's The Living Corpse.

Ali Zeynalov was also recognized as a master of oratory. Ali Zeynalov starred in the films  (1959),  (1960),  (1961),  (1961), and others.

Ali Zeynalov was married to Azerbaijani actress . He died in Baku in 1988.

Filmography 

  (1948)
 Bakhtiyar (1955)
 The Meeting (1955)
 Young Metallurgists (1956)
  (1956)
  (1956)
  (1958)
  (1958)
 On Distant Shores (1958)
 The Stepmother (1958)
  (1959)
  (1960)
  (1960)
  (1960)
  (1960
 The Adventures of Molla (1960)
   (1961)
  (1961)
  (1962)
  (1962)
  (1963)
  (1963)
  (1965)
  (1966)
  (1966)
   (1966)
 The Mailbox (1967)
  (1967)
  (1968)
  (1968)
 Last night of childhood (1968)
 Vagif (1968)
  (1972)
  (1976)
 Face to the Wind (1977)
 Babek (1979)
  (1981)
  (1981)
 The Old Pier (1984)
  (1985)

References 

1913 births
1988 deaths
20th-century Azerbaijani male actors
Azerbaijani male film actors
Azerbaijani male stage actors
People's Artists of Azerbaijan
Soviet male actors
People from Salyan, Azerbaijan